Per Brandtzæg (9 June 1936 – 11 September 2016) was a Norwegian dentist.

He was a professor of medicine at the University of Oslo. In November 2006 he was proclaimed Commander of the Order of St. Olav in recognition of his work. He was a member of the Norwegian Academy of Science and Letters.

He was also known to the general public as a proponent to retry the case of Fredrik Fasting Torgersen.

References

1936 births
2016 deaths
Norwegian dentists
Academic staff of the University of Oslo
Members of the Norwegian Academy of Science and Letters